Euryxanthops chiltoni is a species of crab found in the New Zealand Exclusive Economic Zone. It was first described by Colin McLay and Peter Ng in a 2007 paper, along with Medaeops serenei.

References

Xanthoidea
Crustaceans described in 2007